Brian Giuseppe Meehl (also known as Brian Muehl; born August 24, 1952), is an American puppeteer and writer.

Biography
Meehl was born in Canandaigua, New York and grew up mostly in Iowa City, Iowa.

Meehl worked on the last six shows of The Muppet Show. He then worked on Sesame Street, performing Barkley, Grundgetta, Telly Monster, and an early version of Elmo, among other characters. His work with Henson also included roles in the films, The Dark Crystal, The Muppets Take Manhattan and The Great Muppet Caper.

In 1984, Meehl left the Muppets and began writing for children's television series including Between the Lions, Codename: Kids Next Door, Cyberchase, the TUGS segments for Salty's Lighthouse, Eureeka's Castle, Eyewitness for the BBC and DK Vision and The Magic School Bus.

Meehl has written seven young adult novels: Out of Patience (2008), Suck It Up (2009), You Don't Know About Me (2011), and Suck It Up and Die (2012). He released an eBook and paperback adult novel, Pastime, in 2012. More recently, Meehl has completed his Blowback Trilogy: Blowback '07, (2016), Blowback '63 (2017), and Blowback '94 (2020) about time-traveling teenage twins who fall back into little known but pivotal events in history.

Filmography

Television
 The Muppet Show - Additional Muppets
 Sesame Street - Barkley (1978–1984, 1988), Clementine (1979–1984), Dr. Nobel Price (1979–1984), Elmo (1980–1984), Grundgetta (1980–1984), Othmar the Grouch, Pearl, Rusty, Telly Monster (1979–1984), Additional Muppets
 Eureeka's Castle - Bogge and Mr. Knack
 Dog City - Bruno
 The Wubbulous World of Dr. Seuss - Binkham Tamino McDoyal the Third (in "Norval the Great")

Film
 Big Bird in China - Barkley, Telly Monster
 The Dark Crystal - SkekEkt/The Ornamentalist, UrSu/The Dying Master, UrZah/The Ritual Guardian (puppetry only)
 The Great Muppet Caper - Additional Muppets
 The Muppets Take Manhattan - Tatooey Rat, Telly Monster, Clementine, Additional Muppets
 The Song of the Cloud Forest - Additional Muppets
 Big Bird in Japan - Barkley

References

External links
 
 Author page at Random House website
 

1952 births
Living people
21st-century American novelists
American male novelists
American puppeteers
American television writers
American male television writers
Sesame Street Muppeteers
Novelists from Connecticut
American male screenwriters
People from Canandaigua, New York
20th-century American novelists
People from Redding, Connecticut
Screenwriters from New York (state)
20th-century American male writers
21st-century American male writers